The 2008 La Serena Open was a men's tennis tournament played on outdoor clay courts. It was the 3rd and final edition of the event, and part of the 2008 ATP Challenger Series of the 2008 ATP Tour. It took place at the tennis courts at the La Serena Golf resort in La Serena, Chile, from 14 through 20 January 2008.

The highlight of the tournament was the presence of Argentinian Mariano Puerta, former French Open runner-up in 2005, who returned to tennis in June 2007 after a 2-year ban due to doping. A temporary court with a capacity of 1,500 was specially built for the tournament.

Points and prize money

Point distribution

Prize money

* per team

Singles main draw entrants

Seeds

1 Rankings as of 7 January 2008.

Other entrants
The following players received wildcards into the singles main draw:
  Guillermo Hormazábal
  Nicolás Lapentti
  Hans Podlipnik-Castillo

The following players received entry from the qualifying draw:
  Martín Alund
  Alejandro Fabbri
  Matteo Marrai
  David Marrero

The following player received entry as lucky loser:
  Alejandro Kon

Withdrawals
Before the tournament
  Edgardo Massa → replaced by Kon

Retirements
  Gustavo Marcaccio
  Cristian Villagrán

Doubles main draw entrants

Seeds

1 Rankings as of 7 January 2008.

Other entrants
The following pairs received wildcards into the doubles main draw:
  Jorge Aguilar /  Pablo Figueroa
  Adrián García /  Rodrigo Urzúa
  Guillermo Hormazábal /  Hans Podlipnik-Castillo

The following pair received entry as alternates:
  Matteo Marrai /  Walter Trusendi

Withdrawals
Before the tournament
  Franco Ferreiro /  Manuel Jorquera → replaced by Marrai/Trusendi

Champions

Singles

  Rubén Ramírez Hidalgo defeated  David Marrero, 6–3, 6–1
It was the 5th Challenger title for Ramírez Hidalgo in his singles career.

Doubles

  Nicolás Lapentti /  Eduardo Schwank defeated  Sebastián Decoud /  Cristian Villagrán, 6–4, 6–0

References

External links
 Official Results Archive (ATP)
 Official Results Archive (ITF)
 Singles Draw (ATP)
 Doubles Draw (ATP)
 La Serena Golf website

La Serena
La Serena Open